Basat Beygi (also Romanized as Basāţ Beygī; also known as Qal‘eh-ye Basāţ Beygī and Qal’eh Basāt) is a village in Kunani Rural District, Kunani District, Kuhdasht County, Lorestan Province, Iran. At the 2006 census, its population was 2,676, in 546 families.

References 

Towns and villages in Kuhdasht County